Acidosasa is a genus of East Asian bamboo in the grass family.

Acidosasa is found primarily in Southern China, with 1 species in Vietnam. Its name is formed from Latin acidum ("sour") and Sasa (another bamboo genus), referring to its edible shoots. Young shoots of the plants are preserved by the local population.

Species

formerly included
see Indosasa Oligostachyum Pleioblastus Pseudosasa

See also
List of Poaceae genera

References

Bambusoideae
Grasses of Asia
Flora of Vietnam
Grasses of China
Bambusoideae genera